Wixenford School, also known as Wixenford Preparatory School and Wixenford-Eversley, was a private preparatory school for boys near Wokingham, founded in 1869. A feeder school for Eton, after it closed in 1934 its former buildings were taken over by the present-day Ludgrove School.

History
The school was founded in 1869 at Wixenford House, Eversley, Hampshire, by its first head master, Richard Cowley Powles (1819–1901), a Church of England cleric, and has been described as "successful and fashionable". Among the school's first intake of boys, in May 1869, was George Nathaniel Curzon, a future Viceroy of India.

Before being attached to the school, "Wixenford" was the name of its first home, a new house built for Powles at Eversley in 1868–69. Powles, who in his youth had been a fellow of Exeter College, Oxford, had previously operated a school at Blackheath, and he came to Eversley to be near his lifelong friend Charles Kingsley. After Kingsley's death in 1875, Powles became less active in the school and retired as headmaster in 1879. He moved to Chichester in 1881, where he became a prebendary of the cathedral. One of his boys at Wixenford, Albert Baillie, writing in the 1950s, recalled Powles as "a genuine educator and a remarkable man" and noted that he had worn his hair "neatly brushed up into two horns above his ears".

Powles was succeeded in 1879 by Ernest Penrose Arnold, a graduate of Balliol College, Oxford, the son of Charles Thomas Arnold (1817–1878) who taught at Rugby School. E. P. Arnold remained as head master of the school until 1903. At six feet, five inches, in height, Arnold has been described by Rupert Croft-Cooke as "a kindly but rather frightening bearded man". Wixenford was still small, as most such schools were at the time, and a school photograph of the early 1880s shows thirty-nine boys, plus Arnold and five other masters.

The school moved to Luckley Park, Wokingham, Berkshire, in 1887. Throughout its history, it had a close connection with Eton, to which many boys progressed at about the age of thirteen. A few boys stayed longer, and at least one, Peter Anson, was almost fifteen when he left the school in the summer of 1904.

In 1903 Arnold was succeeded by Philip Howard Morton (1857–1925), who had been a Cambridge cricketer, and in 1910 Country Life magazine noted that he kept a private golf course at the school and that his boys played golf "vigorously" in the Easter term. In 1910, Morton was joined by two joint headmasters, who were business partners, Harold Wallis and Ernest Garnett, forming a triumvirate. By 1920, Morton had retired and had been replaced by Charles Mansfield, but Wallis and Garnett remained. By 1924, Mansfield was acting as the sole head master, with the other two men as partners. In September 1931 Garnett withdrew from the partnership.

Amid the Great Depression of the 1930s, Wixenford suffered a decline in numbers and finally closed in 1934. With its demise, its former buildings presented an opportunity for another fashionable prep school, Ludgrove, until then based at Cockfosters, which moved onto the site in 1937. While retaining its existing school name, Ludgrove initially kept "Wixenford" as the name of its new premises.

The original Wixenford House, in which the school was begun, is now the home of St Neot's Preparatory School.

Old Wixenfordians

Old boys of the school are called Old Wixenfordians. The following, in chronological order, are among the most notable.

George Nathaniel Curzon, 1st Marquess Curzon of Kedleston (1859–1925), Viceroy of India and British Foreign Secretary
Thomas Gibson-Carmichael, 1st Baron Carmichael (1859–1926), Liberal politician and colonial administrator
Sir Wilfrid Lawson, 3rd Baronet, of Brayton (1862–1937), Liberal member of parliament 
Cyril Maude (1862–1951), actor-manager
Albert Victor Baillie (1864–1955), Dean of Windsor
Lord Alfred Douglas, or "Bosie" (1870–1945), poet and translator, intimate friend of Oscar Wilde
Frederick Pethick-Lawrence, 1st Baron Pethick-Lawrence (1871–1961), Labour politician, Secretary of State for India
R. C. Trevelyan (1872–1951), poet
Hugh Law (1872–1943), Irish politician 
Nugent Hicks (1872–1942), Bishop of Lincoln
Sir Walter Wilson Greg (1875–1959), Shakespeare scholar
George Macaulay Trevelyan (1876–1962), historian
Arnold Wienholt (1877–1940), Australian politician
Edmund Parker, 4th Earl of Morley (1877–1951), soldier and landowner 
Sir Howard Kennard (1878–1955), British diplomat
William Leveson-Gower, 4th Earl Granville (1880–1953), admiral 
Sir Stewart Gore-Browne (1883–1967), settler and politician in Northern Rhodesia
Ralph Glyn, 1st Baron Glyn (1884–1960), soldier and Conservative politician
Peter Anson (1889–1975), monk, writer, and artist
Duff Cooper (1890–1954), Conservative politician and diplomat
William Howard, 8th Earl of Wicklow (1902–1978), clergyman, writer and translator
Sir Edmund Bacon, 13th Baronet, KG (1903–1982), landowner and Lord Lieutenant of Norfolk
Kenneth Clark (1903–1983), art historian
Prince Charles, Count of Flanders (1903–1983)
Alfred Duggan (1903–1964), historical novelist 
Hubert Duggan (1904–1943), Conservative politician
James Stern (1904–1993), Anglo-Irish writer
Sir Harold Acton (1904–1994), historian 
Edward Ward, 7th Viscount Bangor (1905–1993), BBC war correspondent and author
David Herbert (1908–1995), socialite, memoirist and interior decorator
Sir Frederick Warner (1918–1995), diplomat
Sir Guy Millard (1917–2013), British Ambassador
William Whitelaw, 1st Viscount Whitelaw, (1918–1999), Home Secretary
Henry Paget, 7th Marquess of Anglesey (1922–2013), author and peer

Notes

Boys' schools in Berkshire
Boarding schools in Berkshire
Boys' schools in Hampshire
Boarding schools in Hampshire
Defunct schools in the Borough of Wokingham
1869 establishments in England
Educational institutions disestablished in 1934
Preparatory schools in Berkshire
Preparatory schools in Hampshire
Defunct boarding schools in England